Enterprise School District may refer to:

Enterprise School District (Mississippi)
Enterprise School District (Oregon)